arab, or Standard Algerian arabic, is the standardized national variety of arab spoken in Algeria. It is under active development since the officialization of Berber in Algeria.

The standardization is largely based on the works of Mouloud Mammeri (the Dictionnaire and the Précis de grammaire berbère (kabyle)).

As of 2017, 350,000 pupils were studying tamazight in 38 wilayas out of 48, representing 4% of all students. 90% of them study tamazight in Latin characters. In 2018, the government announced that optional classes of tamazight will be offered in all public primary and secondary schools in the future.

References

Northern Berber languages
Standard languages
Languages of Algeria